Jamie Gillan (born 4 July 1997), nicknamed the Scottish Hammer, is a Scottish professional American football punter for the New York Giants of the National Football League (NFL). He played college football at Arkansas–Pine Bluff.

Early years
Originally from Morayshire, Scotland, Gillan first played for Highland Rugby Club, before attending and playing rugby for Merchiston Castle School in Edinburgh. In 2013, he moved to Leonardtown, Maryland, where his father was stationed as a member of the Royal Air Force, and Gillan began playing American football in high school there. He then went on to play college football at Arkansas–Pine Bluff, receiving the scholarship offer through a Facebook invitation. Across his four years at Arkansas–Pine Bluff, Gillan had a total of 9,024 yards on 214 punts and average of 42.2 yards per punt. During a pre-draft workout, he reportedly popped three regulation-size NFL footballs.

Professional career

Cleveland Browns
After going undrafted in the 2019 NFL Draft, Gillan signed with the Cleveland Browns. In the team's second 2019 preseason game against the Indianapolis Colts, Gillan blasted a 74-yard punt. On 31 August 2019, he was named the starting punter for the Cleveland Browns over veteran Britton Colquitt.

In Week 2, Gillan punted six times, five landing inside the 20 with a long of 47 in a 23–3 win over the New York Jets, earning him AFC Special Teams Player of the Week. After having 11 punts inside the 20 and only allowing 19 punt return yards Gillan was named AFC Special Teams Player of the Month in September. In Week 5, Jamie Gillan punted 7 times for 397 yards including a 71-yard punt that set a career long for Gillan. Gillan ended his rookie season with 63 punts for 2913 yards (2622 net yards) with 28 punts downed inside the 20 yard line which earned him a spot on the Pro Football Writers Association All-Rookie team.

Gillan was placed on the reserve/COVID-19 list by the Browns on 30 July 2020, and activated from the list four days later.

Gillan was waived by the Browns on 22 December 2021.

Buffalo Bills
On 24 December 2021, Gillan was signed to the Buffalo Bills practice squad.

New York Giants
On 7 February 2022, the New York Giants signed Gillan to reserve/future contract and he became the lead contender to be the Giants' 2022 punter when the team released Riley Dixon in March. He kicked several field goals in a preseason game against the Bengals following an injury to Graham Gano, and made the 53 man roster.

On 12 December 2022, while playing in a game against the Philadelphia Eagles, Gillan was flagged for a rare illegal kick penalty. While attempting a punt, Gillan fumbled the snap and kicked the ball after it bounced off the ground. While drop kicks are legal in the National Football League during a field goal, officials decided Gillan's kick was illegal and levied a 10 yard "Illegal kick of the football" penalty against the Giants.

On 13 March 2023, Gillan signed a two-year, $4 million contract extension with the Giants.

Personal life
Gillan is nicknamed "The Scottish Hammer."

Gillan originally came to the United States on a NATO visa through his father. This was never changed to a work visa when he joined the NFL. When he traveled to London to play in a game with the New York Giants in October 2022, the visa issue delayed his return to the United States, and U.S. diplomats had to intervene to update his visa.

References

External links
New York Giants bio
Arkansas–Pine Bluff Golden Lions bio

1997 births
Living people
People educated at Merchiston Castle School
Scottish players of American football
American football punters
Sportspeople from Inverness
Scottish rugby union players
Arkansas–Pine Bluff Golden Lions football players
Cleveland Browns players
Buffalo Bills players
New York Giants players